Branch Lake is a lake in Haliburton County, Ontario, Canada in the southern extension of Algonquin Park. The York River flows into and exits from the lake. The North York River joins the York River at the lake.

See also
List of lakes in Ontario

Sources
 Atlas of Canada Topographic Map Sheet Numbers 031E01 retrieved 2007-11-04

Lakes of Haliburton County